Cedric Thornton (born June 21, 1988) is a former American football defensive tackle. He was signed by the Philadelphia Eagles as an undrafted free agent in 2011. He played college football at Southern Arkansas University.

Early years
Thornton attended Star City High School, where he practiced football, baseball and basketball. In football, he played as a  running back and wide receiver.

Thornton walked on to Division II Southern Arkansas University to join his brother. He was converted into a defensive end and became a starter as a junior, recording 80 tackles (first on the team), 23 tackles for loss (ranked first in college football), 8.5 sacks, 2 forced fumbles and 2 blocked kicks. The next year, he had 52 tackles (third on the team), 13 tackles for loss, 1.5 sacks, 5 quarterback hurries (led the team) and one forced fumble.

Professional career

Philadelphia Eagles
Thornton signed by the Philadelphia Eagles as an undrafted free agent following the 2011 NFL Draft and NFL lockout. He initially made the 53-man roster after training camp to open the season, but was waived to make room for offensive lineman Kyle DeVan on September 4. He was re-signed to the team's practice squad the next day, where he spent the first thirteen weeks of the season. On December 12, he was promoted to the active roster and was declared inactive for the last three games.

In 2012, Thornton's playing time increased as a backup on the defensive line rotation, while registering 47 tackles, 2 tackles for loss and one sack. His best game came against the Atlanta Falcons, when he had 8 tackles and one sack. 

In 2013, he became the starting defensive end in the Eagles 3-4 defense, posting 78 tackles, 5 tackles for loss (third on the team) and one sack. The next year, he missed 3 games with a hand injury, but still had 61 tackles, 3 tackles for loss, one sack and 3 fumble recoveries.

Dallas Cowboys
On March 10, 2016, Thornton signed a four-year contract with the Dallas Cowboys worth more than $18 million and $6 million guaranteed, with the intention of moving him from defensive end to defensive tackle. 

His season was seen as something of a disappointment, because he couldn't supplant Terrell McClain or rookie Maliek Collins in the starting lineup and was relegated to a backup role as part of the defensive tackle rotation. He missed the last 3 games against the Tampa Bay Buccaneers, Detroit Lions and Philadelphia Eagles with a high ankle sprain. He finished with 22 tackles, 1.5 sacks, one forced fumble and a fumble recovery.

After undergoing offseason shoulder surgery, he entered the 2017 organized team activities as the leading candidate to replace McClain, who had left in free agency. He injured his hamstring after being off to a good start, which forced him to miss several weeks of training camp. He was eventually passed on the depth chart by free agent acquisition Stephen Paea. Although his $3 million base salary was guaranteed for the season, the Cowboys released him on September 3, after claiming defensive tackle Brian Price off waivers.

Buffalo Bills
On September 5, 2017, Thornton signed with the Buffalo Bills. He appeared in 15 games with 3 starts.

San Francisco 49ers
On July 25, 2018, Thornton signed with the San Francisco 49ers.

On August 22, 2018, Thornton announced his retirement from the NFL after six seasons.

On April 15, 2019, Thornton came out of retirement after sitting out 2018, and was added to the 49ers active roster. He was released on July 26, 2019.

References

External links

1988 births
Living people
People from Star City, Arkansas
Players of American football from Arkansas
American football defensive tackles
American football defensive ends
Southern Arkansas Muleriders football players
Philadelphia Eagles players
Dallas Cowboys players
Buffalo Bills players
San Francisco 49ers players